Tripura Institute of Technology (TIT), formerly Polytechnic Institute, Narsingarh, is an engineering college located at Narsingarh in the West Tripura district of Tripura, India, 12 km from Agartala. It offers diploma and degree courses in Engineering and Technology.

History
The institute started in 1958 as Polytechnic Institute, Narsingarh, with branches of Civil, Electrical and Mechanical Engineering, affiliated to the West Bengal State Council of Technical Education. Electronics and Telecommunication Engineering was started in 1995.

The Ministry of Human Resource and World Bank began the Tech. Ed.-III project for student capacity increase and quality improvement, in the period 2001 to 2007. The project resulted in new branches in Computer Science and Technology, Food Processing Technology, Automobile Engineering, Interior Decoration Handicrafts and Furniture Designing and Modern Office Practice and Management. 

With the introduction of the degree module from the academic session 2007-08 the entire academic control of both degree and diploma came under Tripura University. The diploma level students already registered under West Bengal State Council of Technical Education up to the academic session 2006-07 remained with WBSCTE. The curricula and other academic control of the Tripura Institute of Technology both of diploma and degree, came under the control of Tripura University from June 2007.

Departments 

Architectural Assistant-ship
Automobile Engineering
Civil Engineering
Computer Science and Engineering
Electrical Engineering
Electronics and Telecommunication Engineering
Food Processing Technology
Mechanical Engineering
Science and Humanities
Textile Technology

Campus
TIT is located at its own campus at Narsingarh, a suburb of Agartala.  The campus is situated 2 km from the Agartala Airport. As of now the institute runs two campus, one for the Diploma and the other for the Degree Module.

Events

Ishaanya 
Ishaanya is an annual Techno-Cultural fest organised by the student body of Tripura Institute of Technology. Various cultural activities such as dances, music, dramas, etc are organised and participated by the students, apart from cultural activities, there are technical activities such as Quiz competition, designs, etc where students participate and compete at.

FreshTech 
FreshTech is a freshers party organised by the student body of Tripura Institute of Technology for first year students. Various cultural activities such as dances, music, dramas, etc are organised and participated by the first year students

See also 
Education in Tripura
List of institutions of higher education in Tripura

External links
Official website

All India Council for Technical Education
Engineering colleges in Tripura
Educational institutions established in 1958
1958 establishments in Tripura
Colleges in Tripura